Clinosperma lanuginosa is a species of flowering plant in the family Arecaceae. It is found only in New Caledonia.

References

Clinospermatinae
Endemic flora of New Caledonia
Conservation dependent plants
Plants described in 1976
Taxonomy articles created by Polbot